Hughes Europe is an operating and sales organisation for Hughes Network Systems, LLC (HUGHES) with its facilities in Germany, Great Britain and Italy.

These facilities are mainly used to provide Internet access to organisations and other institutions via satellites and traditional terrestrial connections.

Hughes Europe develops, installs, manages and maintains company communications networks.  It provides fast broadband internet access and Managed Network Solutions for companies of all sizes across a broad range of industries, including the automobile, retail, energy (oil and gas), financial services, industrial, information technology, telecommunications and lottery sectors.

Broadband services and solutions
Under the HughesNet name brand, Hughes Europe offers Managed Network Services and Managed Digital Media Solutions. These include:

Terrestrial and satellite-based broadband networks
Hybrid broadband networks
Backup solutions
Broadband internet access
Digital signage
Business IPTV (company communications and interactive employee training)
IP Multicast services for data transmission via satellite

Hughes Europe broadband satellite products are based on global standards approved by the TIA, ETSI and ITU standards organisations, including IPoS/DVB-2, RSM-A and GMR-1

History 
Hughes Europe is a wholly owned subsidiary of Hughes Network Systems, LLC (HNS) .

The firm was begun as a 50/50 joint venture between Hughes and Olivetti in 1996 and was referred as Hughes-Olivetti Telecom.  In 1998, Hughes purchased all of Olivetti’s shares and renamed it HOT Telecommunications, which was subsequently rolled into Hughes Europe as a single operating entity in 2003 .

HughesNet Broadband Solutions and Services 
HughesNet products and services are sold throughout Europe both directly and via a network of value added resellers.

Management 
Christopher Britton – Managing Director, Hughes Europe

See also 
 Hughes Network Systems
 HughesNet
 SPACEWAY

Notes

External links/References 
 Comsys VSAT report, 10th edition 2007
 http://www.hugheseurope.com (Hughes Europe)

Howard Hughes
Telecommunications companies of Germany